Dust to Dust is best-known from the phrase "Earth to earth, ashes to ashes, dust to dust" from the funeral service in the Book of Common Prayer

It may also refer to:

Film 
 Dust to Dust (1938 film) or Child Bride, an exploitation film about child marriage
 Dust to Dust (1994 film), a Western starring George Eads
 Dust to Dust (2000 film), a Mexican film
 Dust to Dust (2002 film), a documentary made by the husband of Sandra Brown
 Dust to Dust: The Health Effects of 9/11, a 2006 documentary by Heidi Dehncke-Fisher

Music 
 Dust to Dust (Heavenly album), a 2004 album and a track on the album
 Dust to Dust (Pete Nice and DJ Richie Rich album), a 1993 album and a trac on the album
 Dust to Dust, a 2001 Hilmar Örn Hilmarsson album
 "Dust to Dust", a song on 1999 album Famous Monsters by The Misfits
 "Dust to Dust", a song on the 1996 album  Skold by Tim Skold
 "Dust To Dust", a song on the 1984 album Jesus Commands Us to Go! by Keith Green
 "Dust To Dust", a track on the soundtrack to Final Fantasy XIII  by Masashi Hamauzu
 "Dust to Dust" (song), a 2013 song by The Civil Wars
 "Dust to Dust", a  song by John Kirkpatrick, entirely in the Locrian mode

Other media 
 Dust to Dust (novel), a 2000 novel by Tami Hoag
 Dust to Dust (comic), a 2010 prequel to the novel Do Androids Dream of Electric Sheep?
 "Dust to Dust" (Babylon 5), a 1996 episode of Babylon 5
 "Dust to Dust", a 1989 episode of War of the Worlds
 30 Days of Night: Dust to Dust, a 2008 miniseries
 "Dust to Dust", the final mission in the Call of Duty: Modern Warfare 3 campaign mode

See also
 Ashes to Ashes (disambiguation)